Mountain Ash Urban District was a local authority in Mountain Ash, in the Cynon Valley, Glamorgan,  Wales. It was created in 1894 as a result of the 1894 Local Government of England and Wales Act. The council replaced the Mountain Ash Local Board of Health which had been established in 1867. Initially, the Council had fifteen members, but this was increased to eighteen in 1898. The council was based at Mountain Ash Town Hall. The urban district was abolished in 1974, becoming part of the borough of Cynon Valley, which was in turn abolished in 1996 to become part of Rhondda Cynon Taf.

Election Results in the 1890s

1894 Election
The inaugural election was held in December 1894. Among those elected were two checkweighers at local collieries, John Powell and John Williams. Williams later served as MP for Gower from 1906 until 1922.

East Ward

South Ward

West Ward

1896 Election
In two of the three wards candidates were returned unopposed.

East Ward

South Ward

West Ward
The only contested election in the West Ward was contested by four Liberals.

1898 Election
Following significant growth in the population of the locality the wards were redrawn for this election and all members were obliged to seek re-election for six new wards, each of which returned three members. A number of nominated candidates withdrew before the election. Several retiring councillors were defeated.

Abercynon Ward

Darranlas Ward

Duffryn Ward

Miskin Ward

Penrhiwceiber Ward

Ynysybwl Ward

1899 Election
Only one ward was contested, namely Miskin, where Adam Clark regained a seat he has lost the previous year.  In Duffryn Ward the sitting councillor William Litle was nominated but withdrew in favour of Gwilym Jones, a former member defeated in 1898.

Abercynon Ward

Darranlas Ward

Duffryn Ward

Miskin Ward

Penrhiwceiber Ward

Ynysybwl Ward

1908 Election
There were elections in all four wards.

Darranlas Ward

Duffryn Ward

Penrhiwceiber Ward

Abercynon Ward

References

Urban districts of Wales
Rhondda Cynon Taf